The VHT S5000 Australian Drivers' Championship (known originally as the Australian S5000 Championship, or simply S5000) is a current open-wheel road racing  series in Australia. The series was created by a merger between two proposed series, Formula Thunder 5000 and Super5000. The series is promoted by the Australian Racing Group.

The inaugural race of the series was originally set to be in Sydney Motorsport Park in May 2019, but was delayed to September due to supply issues from Ligier's Charlotte area factory where the chassis are manufactured.

History 
Australian circuit racing, since the end of Tasman Series racing in the 1970s, been heavily focused on touring car racing at the professional level.  Open wheeler formula racing series such as Formula Holden and Formula 3 struggled to gain spectator and sponsor interest, and eventually folded.   

The idea for a modern interpretation of the historic Formula 5000 class was first raised in 2016, and was initially called the Formula Thunder 5000. The original car used a Swift FN09 chassis that raced in Super Formula between 2009 and 2013.

A year later in 2017, the Super5000 series was later created by former Supercars CEO James Warburton, as part of his plan to sustain growth of motorsport in Australia. The series would originally be used as a support category for the Supercars series, alongside the Super2 and SuperUtes series. The creation of this series led to controversy, and the founder of Formula Thunder 5000, Chris Lambden, disapproved of the idea, claiming it would threaten his own plans.

Later that same year, both series announced a merger in a bid to further ensure the return of a formula racing series in Australia. The formation of the S5000 series came as a result, and would incorporate technical elements from both the Formula Thunder 5000 and the Super5000 series.

A preliminary schedule was originally announced in 2018, with Sydney Motorsport Park as the season opener. However, in April 2019, the organisers announced that the series would be delayed four months and that the inaugural season would instead kick off in September 2019 at Sandown Raceway, due to supply issues from Ligier's Charlotte area factory. The organisers also wanted to ensure that the S5000 car would be properly tested.

The first event attracted an entry of 13 drivers, including former Formula One driver Rubens Barrichello. The feature race was marred, however, by an accident involving Alex Davison which caused damage to safety barriers and forced organisers to red-flag the race after just 10 of the scheduled 25 laps. The race was won by James Golding, with Barrichello second and John Martin in third. A second event was held at The Bend, with the feature race being won by John Martin.

For 2020, a six round championship was planned, set to start as a support event for the 2020 Australian Grand Prix held at Albert Park, with the championship to be followed by a non-championship race at Mount Panorama. It was also announced in early 2020 that the championship would see the revival of the Australian Drivers' Championship title, last awarded in 2014 Australian Drivers' Championship for Formula 3 cars. This was accompanied by a plan to award trophies named after prominent Australian racing drivers to the winners of each feature race, with the winner of the feature race at Albert Park to be awarded the Alan Jones Cup.

The opening round attracted a larger entry, including inaugural feature race winner Golding, two-time Australian Drivers' Champion Tim Macrow, and international entrants including the return of Barrichello and fellow Formula One veteran Giancarlo Fisichella, Formula 2 driver Jack Aitken and 2019 Bathurst 1000 winner Alexandre Prémat. After practice and qualifying sessions on Thursday 12 March, Golding had pole position. However, on Friday morning the entire Grand Prix meeting was called off as a result of the escalating COVID-19 pandemic, so no race was held. Due to ongoing difficulties surrounding the pandemic, modified calendars were announced a few times over the year, with plans made for a championship running over late 2020 into early 2021. In the end, however, no races were held in 2020 and instead a short four race calendar was announced to be run in early 2021, with a second, longer summer series to run from late 2021 to early 2022.

The first championship event, and first race of the 2021 season, finally got underway in January at Symmons Plains, with Thomas Randle winning the feature race.

Car specification 
The S5000 car's chassis is based on a FIA-compliant Formula 3 bespoke chassis manufactured by French motorsport company Onroak-Ligier. All of the power is driven through a 6-speed gearbox by Holinger. Holinger also supplies the transaxle. The suspension set and the wing package are supplied by Borland Racing Developments, and are then fabricated by Garry Rogers Motorsport, who also perform the assembly of the S5000 car. The tyres are supplied by Hoosier.

The S5000 car has been certified by the FIA under the 2018 safety certification.

The S5000 car made its first public appearance taking part in demonstration runs at the 2018 Newcastle 500 Supercars event with drivers such as Greg Murphy, John Bowe, and Garth Tander going behind the wheel. The race car received a positive reaction from the audience.

Media coverage 
The races are to be aired on streaming service Stan Sport, and they will also be live-streamed by website Motorsport.com through their Motorsport.TV platform.

Champions

Teams 
There are currently 7 teams in the S5000 Australian Drivers Championship. These are; Gary Rogers Motorsport, Team BRM, 88 Racing, Macrow Racing, Modena Engineering, Willmington Motorsport and Astuti Motorsport.

References

External links 
 
 2019 S5000 Australia - Sporting and Technical Regulations, www.cams.com.au, as archived at web.archive.org

Formula racing
Formula racing series
Auto racing series in Australia
One-make series
Recurring sporting events established in 2019